Vilija Aleknaitė-Abramikienė (born 4 May 1957 in Lyduvėnai, Raseiniai district, Lithuania) is a Lithuanian politician and member of the Seimas.

Biography
Aleknaitė-Abramikienė was born to a family of Soviet Lithuania civil servants in Lyduvėnai, Raseiniai district on 4 May 1957.

In 1975 Aleknaitė-Abramikienė graduated from M.K. Čiurlionis art school, in 1980 - from the Lithuanian Conservatory, as a pianist and musicologist. From 1980 she worked at the conservatory as a concertmaster and instructor.

Aleknaitė-Abramikienė joined the activities of Sąjūdis in 1988. In the elections in 1992, Aleknaitė-Abramikienė was elected as the member of the Sixth Seimas through the electoral list of Sąjūdis. In 1993 she was one of the founding members of the Homeland Union party as it emerged from Sąjūdis. She was reelected to the Seimas in the elections of 1996, 2000, 2004,  2008 and 2012.

References

1957 births
Living people
Women members of the Seimas
People from Raseiniai District Municipality
20th-century Lithuanian women politicians
20th-century Lithuanian politicians
21st-century Lithuanian women politicians
21st-century Lithuanian politicians
Homeland Union politicians
Members of the Seimas